David Bell Aaron Jr. (April 12, 1911 – March 26, 1992) was an American football and basketball coach and college athletics administrator. He was hired in 1946 as athletic director, head football coach, and head basketball coach at Austin Peay State College—now known as Austin Peay State University. Aaron served as the head football coach at Austin Peay for nine seasons, from 1946 to 1954, compiling a record of 44–35–6. He was the head basketball coach for 16 seasons, until 1962, tallying a mark of 258–174. Aaron earned Bachelor of Science and Master of Arts degrees at Peabody College and a Bachelor of Laws degree at Cumberland University. He served in the United States Navy during World War II, assigned to the rank of lieutenant commander before his discharge.

Aaron was born on April 12, 1911, in Nashville, Tennessee. He died on March 26, 1992, at Winter Haven Hospital in Winter Haven, Florida.

Head coaching record

Football

References

External links
 

1911 births
1992 deaths
Austin Peay Governors athletic directors
Austin Peay Governors football coaches
Austin Peay Governors men's basketball coaches
Cumberland University alumni
Peabody College alumni
United States Navy officers
United States Navy personnel of World War II
Sportspeople from Nashville, Tennessee
Coaches of American football from Tennessee
Basketball coaches from Tennessee